Langland could refer to:

People
 Joseph Langland, American poet
 Tuck Langland, American sculptor
 William Langland, fourteenth-century English poet

Places
 Langland, Swansea, village on Langland Bay, on the Gower Peninsula of south-west Wales
 Langland, Caithness, in Scotland